The 2013–14 season is PAS Giannina F.C.'s 19th competitive season in the top flight of Greek football, 4th season in the Super League Greece, and 48th year in existence as a football club. They also compete in the Greek Cup.

Players 
Updated:-

International players

Foreign players

Personnel

Management

Coaching staff

medical staff

Scouting

Academy

Transfers

Summer

In

Out 

For recent transfers, see

Winter

In

Out

Pre-season and friendlies

Competitions

Super League Greece

League table

Results summary



Fixtures

Greek cup

Second round

Statistics

Appearances 

Super League Greece

Goalscorers 

Super League Greece

Clean sheets

Disciplinary record

References

External links 

 Official Website

PAS Giannina F.C. seasons
Greek football clubs 2013–14 season